The FIL European Luge Championships 1955 took place in Hahnenklee, West Germany under the auspices of the Fédération Internationale de Bobsleigh et de Tobogganing (FIBT - International Bobsleigh and Tobogganing Federation in ) under their "Section de Luge", a trend that would continue until the International Luge Federation (FIL) was formed in 1957.

Men's singles

Women's singles

Isser won her fourth straight European championship at this event.

Men's doubles

Prior to World War II, Grundmann competed for Czechoslovakia, winning a bronze in this event in 1938.

Medal table

References
Men's doubles European champions
Men's singles European champions
Women's singles European champions

FIL European Luge Championships
1955 in luge
Luge in Germany
1955 in German sport